
The following are lists of Paramount Pictures films by decade:

Lists 
List of Paramount Pictures films (1912–1919)
List of Paramount Pictures films (1920–1929)
List of Paramount Pictures films (1930–1939)
List of Paramount Pictures films (1940–1949)
List of Paramount Pictures films (1950–1959)
List of Paramount Pictures films (1960–1969)
List of Paramount Pictures films (1970–1979)
List of Paramount Pictures films (1980–1989)
List of Paramount Pictures films (1990–1999)
List of Paramount Pictures films (2000–2009)
List of Paramount Pictures films (2010–2019)
List of Paramount Pictures films (2020–2029)

See also
 Paramount Pictures
 :Category: Lists of films by studio

External links
 Paramount Pictures Complete Library

 
Lists of films by studio
American films by studio
Paramount Global-related lists